Kangaroo Jack is a 2003 buddy comedy film produced by Castle Rock Entertainment and Jerry Bruckheimer Films, distributed by Warner Bros. Pictures, directed by David McNally with a screenplay by Steve Bing and Scott Rosenberg from a story by Bing and Barry O'Brien. The film is produced by Jerry Bruckheimer with music by Trevor Rabin and stars Jerry O'Connell, Anthony Anderson, Estella Warren, Michael Shannon and Christopher Walken, with Adam Garcia as the uncredited voice of the titular character.

Kangaroo Jack was theatrically released on January 17, 2003. The film grossed $88.1 million worldwide on a $60 million budget, but was panned by both critics and audiences alike, who criticized the acting, directing, writing, humor, violence, and innuendoes, especially for a family film, and false advertising, although the visuals and soundtrack were praised. Kangaroo Jack was released on DVD and VHS on June 24, 2003, by Warner Home Video.

An animated sequel titled Kangaroo Jack: G'Day U.S.A.! was produced and released on video in 2004.

Plot 
In 1982 Brooklyn, a boy named Charlie Carbone is about to become the stepson of a crime boss named Salvatore Maggio. The mobster's apprentice Frankie Lombardo tries to drown Charlie, but a boy named Louis Booker saves him, and they become friends.

Twenty years later, Charlie is running his own beauty salon set up by Sal, whose henchmen take 80% of the salon's profits, barely leaving Charlie enough money for maintenance. After they botch the job of hiding some stolen TVs, Sal gives Charlie and Louis one more chance. Under instructions from Frankie, they are to deliver a package to a man named Mr. Smith in Coober Pedy, Australia. Frankie also warns them against opening the package, and provides them with Mr. Smith's number. Unbeknown to the duo, Sal has cancelled their return trip. Louis opens the package on the plane and finds $50,000 cash.

Upon landing in Australia, Charlie and Louis rent a car and head to Coober Pedy. Along their way, they accidentally run over a red kangaroo. Louis thinks it is dead and puts his jacket and sunglasses on the kangaroo and poses for photographs as a joke, saying the kangaroo looks like one of Sal's henchmen. The kangaroo suddenly regains consciousness, kicks Charlie, and hops away with the $50,000 in the jacket. Charlie and Louis take chase, but crash the car, and the kangaroo escapes.

At a pub in Alice Springs, Louis manages to call Mr. Smith and tries to explain their situation. Mr. Smith, however, thinks they stole his package and threatens to kill Louis and Charlie. Back in New York, Sal gets the call from Mr. Smith complaining that Charlie and Louis haven't arrived; Sal then sends Frankie and some henchmen to Australia to investigate. Meanwhile, Charlie and Louis attempt to reclaim the money from the kangaroo by shooting it with a tranquilizer in a plane. The attempt fails when Louis accidentally shoots Blue, the pilot, and strands the duo in the desert. They spend hours wandering in the desert, during which Charlie hallucinates finding a jeep, and they soon meet an American woman named Jessie from the Outback Wildlife Foundation.

The following day, the trio then track the kangaroo to the Todd River and try again to catch it with bolas, but Louis accidentally botches their attempt when ants crawl up his pants. While waiting for the next opportunity to catch the kangaroo, Charlie begins developing feelings for Jessie. Mr. Smith and his henchmen shortly arrive and capture the trio. Charlie and Louis outsmart them, but find Frankie has tracked them down and is prepared to kill them. The kangaroo suddenly returns, causing a fist fight between Mr. Smith's henchmen and Frankie's crew, who outmatch them. The distraction allows Charlie, Louis and Jessie to escape. A final chase ensues, with the duo chasing after the kangaroo while being pursued by Frankie and his goons. Louis finally manages to retrieve the money from the kangaroo but nearly falls off a cliff and is narrowly saved by Charlie. Charlie tries to hand the money to Frankie, but the latter angrily declines and reveals that Sal sent them to Australia to pay for their own execution at the hands of Mr. Smith. The police force led by an undercover cop (disguised as an Outback guide) arrive and arrest Frankie, Mr. Smith, and their henchmen. Charlie reclaims Louis' jacket from the kangaroo.

One year later, Charlie and Jessie are married and have used Sal's $50,000 to start a line of new hair care products bearing a kangaroo logo, along with Louis. Frankie, Mr. Smith, and their men have been imprisoned for life, a punishment that Sal had also failed at avoiding. The kangaroo, now called "Kangaroo Jack", is also revealed to be living happily in the Outback. Now able to speak again, Jack breaks the fourth wall, explaining why the film should end with him and closes it with his version of Porky Pig's famous catchphrase "That's all, blokes!"

Cast 

 Jerry O'Connell as Charlie Carbone, the owner of a beauty salon.
 Robert Reid as young Charlie Carbone
 Anthony Anderson as Louis Booker, the best friend of Charlie. Anderson also voiced his kangaroo counterpart in Charlie's nightmare.
 Shawn Smith as young Louis Booker
 Estella Warren as Jessie Carbone, a member of the Outback Wildlife Foundation that helps Charlie and Louis.
 Michael Shannon as Frankie Lombardo, a gangster who is the apprentice of Sal.
 Brian Casey as young Frankie Lombardo
 Christopher Walken as Salvatore "Sal" Maggio, a mobster and Charlie's stepfather. Walken also voiced his kangaroo counterpart in Charlie's nightmare.
 Dyan Cannon as Anna Carbone, Charlie's mother
 Adam Garcia as Kangaroo Jack "Jackie Legs" (voice, uncredited), a red kangaroo whom Louis put his "lucky jacket" on.
 Marton Csokas as Mr. Smith, a man who Charlie and Louis are to deliver a package to.
 Bill Hunter as Blue, a pilot who Charlie and Louis enlist to help catch Jack.
 Tony Nikolakopoulos as Sal's Capo, an unnamed capo who works for Sal.
 David Ngoombujarra as Sergeant Jimmy Inkamale, a man who is an undercover member of the Australian Police
 Christopher James Baker as Crumble
 Lara Cox as Cute Girl On Plane
 Frank Welker as Special Vocal Effects

Production 
Initially the film was titled Down and Under and was shot as a mob comedy in the style of Midnight Run. The film began shooting in Australia in August 2001, lasting about six months in total, and originally included cursing, sex, and violence. However, the film's producers were dissatisfied by the first rough cut. Inspired by positive response to the kangaroo scene in early test screenings, as well as the marketing campaign behind the recently released Snow Dogs, the production shifted the marketing focus away from that of a dark mafia comedy to that of a family-friendly animal picture. Extensive new footage that replaced the animatronic kangaroo with a new CGI one that rapped was shot, and the film was edited down to a PG-rated family animal comedy. Even though Adam Garcia voiced Kangaroo Jack, he was not credited for the role.

Release

Theatrical release 
Kangaroo Jack was theatrically released on January 17, 2003, by Warner Bros. Pictures.

Home media 
Kangaroo Jack was released on DVD and VHS on June 24, 2003, by Warner Home Video. The film was then re-released on DVD in 2011.

Reception

Box office 
The film was released on January 17, 2003 and ranked No. 1 that weekend. It grossed $66,934,963 at the North American domestic box office and $21,994,148 internationally for a worldwide total of $88,929,111.

Critical response 
Rotten Tomatoes reported that 8% of 115 critics gave the film a positive reviews, with an average rating of 3.4/10. The site's critics consensus reads: "The humor is gratingly dumb, and Kangaroo Jack contains too much violence and sexual innuendo for a family movie." On Metacritic it holds a weighted average score of 16 out of 100 based 25 critics, indicating "overwhelming dislike." Audiences polled by CinemaScore gave the film an average grade of "A−" on an A+ to F scale.

Joe McGovern in The Village Voice described Kangaroo Jack as "witless" and stated "The colorless script...seems to have written itself from a patchwork of Wile E. Coyote cartoons, camel farts, and every high-pitched Aussie cliché to have echoed on these shores". Nathan Rabin, reviewing the film for The A.V. Club, remarked "Kangaroo Jacks premise, trailer, and commercials promise little more than the spectacle of two enthusiastic actors being kicked over and over again by a sassy, computer-animated kangaroo—and, sadly, the film fails to deliver even that." Gary Slaymaker in the British newspaper The Western Mail wrote  "Kangaroo Jack is the most witless, pointless, charmless drivel unleashed on an unsuspecting public".

Awards 
For their performances, Anthony Anderson and Christopher Walken were both nominated for Worst Supporting Actor at the 24th Golden Raspberry Awards, but they lost to Sylvester Stallone for Spy Kids 3-D: Game Over. The Australian
newspaper The Age included Kangaroo Jack on its list of "worst films ever made".

Soundtrack 
The soundtrack was released by Hip-O Records on January 14, 2003.
 DJ Ötzi - "Hey Baby"
 Sugababes - "Round Round"
 Soft Cell - "Tainted Love"
 Lucia - "So Clever"
 Paulina Rubio - "Casanova"
 Shaggy - "Hey Sexy Lady"
 Shawn Desman - "Spread My Wings"
 Lil' Romeo - "2-Way"
 The Wiseguys - "Start the Commotion"
 The Sugarhill Gang - "Rapper's Delight"
 Men at Work - "Down Under"
 The Dude - "Rock Da Juice"

Animated sequel 
The animated sequel Kangaroo Jack: G'Day U.S.A.! was released direct-to-video on November 16, 2004.

References

External links 

 
 
 
 

2003 films
2000s action comedy films
2000s adventure comedy films
2000s children's films
2000s English-language films
Films set in 1982
Films set in 2002
Films set in 2003
American action comedy films
American children's comedy films
Australian comedy films
African-American comedy films
Castle Rock Entertainment films
Films with live action and animation
Films scored by Trevor Rabin
Films about kangaroos and wallabies
Films produced by Jerry Bruckheimer
Films set in New York City
Films set in the Northern Territory
Films set in South Australia
Films set on airplanes
Films shot in New South Wales
Films shot in New York City
Films shot in the Northern Territory
Films shot in South Australia
Films shot in Sydney
Films with screenplays by Scott Rosenberg
American films about revenge
Australian films about revenge
Warner Bros. films
2003 comedy films
2000s American films